Sarund Mata temple, also known as Saroond Mata and chilay mata, is located in Sarund village  near Kotputli on Neem ka thana to Kotputli highway, in the Indian state of Rajasthan.

Though the whole of Rajasthan is full of temples and places of folk deities, but every year in Chaitra and Shardiya Navaratri, there is a large crowd of devotees here.  Thousands of devotees come from every corner of the country, including Rajasthan, to visit the mother.  This temple of Mahabharat time is situated on a arawali hill in village Sarund.  Which one has to climb 284 stairs to reach.  The idol of the mother in the temple installed by the Pandavas during their hidden period. The idol of the Chilay Devi Maa installed in the temple is a form of the total goddess of the Pandavas and their dynasty Tanwar or Tomar Rajput, People from Tanwar Rajput society worship Maa Surund as Kuldevi.

The idol is installed in a cave

Legend has it that in the 16th century, the Mughal emperor Akbar brought a stock of liquor on camels after hearing that the idol of the mother idol was consumed. But each time halfway up the temple, the wines kept on camels used to be empty.  Seeing this, the Mughal emperor Akbar had to bow down.  After this, Akbar got the temple renovated.  The idol is situated in a cave on the hill.  To reach it, one has to pass through seven gates.  Earlier there used to be only one gate.  While the remaining six gates are Mughal carpet.  It is said that these gates were built by Akbar.  This trend continued even during Aurangzeb.

The Mother's Footprint

It is believed that in the night time, Mata Rani travels on a lion herself.  During the ascent of the temple, the footprint of the mother comes halfway while the parikrama of the temple is located as 52 Bhaironu, 56 Kalwa, 64 Yogini, 9 Narasimha and 5 Pir Kshetrapal according to the priests.  Apart from this, the historical temple of Hanuman ji is also located in the middle of the 500 year old stepwell, umbrella and cave.

Fills a three-day fair

A three-day fair fills here from Saptami of Navratri to Navami.  Also, Jagran is also done on the night of Saptami.  This time Jagran will happen on Saturday night.  Apart from this, Jagran is also organized on Shukla Ashtami of every month. The annual festival of the temple is held every year for four consecutive days from Vaishakh Shukla Shashti to Navami.

References

Temples in Rajasthan